In news media and social media, an echo chamber is an environment or ecosystem in which participants encounter beliefs that amplify or reinforce their preexisting beliefs by communication and repetition inside a closed system and insulated from rebuttal. An echo chamber circulates existing views without encountering opposing views, potentially resulting in confirmation bias. Echo chambers may increase social and political polarization and extremism. On social media, it is thought that echo chambers limit exposure to diverse perspectives, and favour and reinforce presupposed narratives and ideologies.

The term is a metaphor based on an acoustic echo chamber, in which sounds reverberate in a hollow enclosure. Another emerging term for this echoing and homogenizing effect within social media communities on the Internet is neotribalism.

Many scholars note the effects that echo chambers can have on citizens' stances and viewpoints, and specifically implications has for politics. However, some studies have suggested that the effects of echo chambers are weaker than often assumed.

Concept 
The Internet has expanded the variety and amount of accessible political information. On the positive side, this may create a more pluralistic form of public debate; on the negative side, greater access to information may lead to selective exposure to ideologically supportive channels. In an extreme "echo chamber", one purveyor of information will make a claim, which many like-minded people then repeat, overhear, and repeat again (often in an exaggerated or otherwise distorted form) until most people assume that some extreme variation of the story is true.

The echo chamber effect occurs online when a harmonious group of people amalgamate and develop tunnel vision. Participants in online discussions may find their opinions constantly echoed back to them, which reinforces their individual belief systems due to the declining exposure to other's opinions. Their individual belief systems are what culminate into a confirmation bias regarding a variety of subjects. When an individual wants something to be true, they often will only gather the information that supports their existing beliefs and disregard any statements they find that are contradictory or speak negatively upon their beliefs. Individuals who participate in echo chambers often do so because they feel more confident that their opinions will be more readily accepted by others in the echo chamber. This happens because the Internet has provided access to a wide range of readily available information. People are receiving their news online more rapidly through less traditional sources, such as Facebook, Google, and Twitter. These and many other social platforms and online media outlets have established personalized algorithms intended to cater specific information to individuals’ online feeds. This method of curating content has replaced the function of the traditional news editor. The mediated spread of information through online networks causes a risk of an algorithmic filter bubble, leading to concern regarding how the effects of echo chambers on the internet promote the division of online interaction.

It is important to note that members of an echo chamber are not fully responsible for their convictions. Once part of an echo chamber, an individual might adhere to seemingly acceptable epistemic practices and still be further misled. Many individuals may be stuck in echo chambers due to factors existing outside of their control, such as being raised in one.

Furthermore, the function of an echo chamber does not entail eroding a member's interest in truth; it focuses upon manipulating their credibility levels so that fundamentally different establishments and institutions will be considered proper sources of authority.

Empirical research 
However,  empirical findings to clearly support these concerns are needed  and the field is very fragmented when it comes to empirical results.  There are some studies  that do measure echo chamber effects, such as the study of Bakshy et al. (2015). In this study the researchers found that people tend to share news articles they align with. Similarly,  they discovered a homophily in online friendships, meaning people are more likely to be connected on social media if they have the same political ideology. In combination, this can lead to echo chamber effects. Bakshy et al. found that a person's potential exposure to cross-cutting content (content that is opposite to their own political beliefs) through their own network is only 24% for liberals and 35% for conservatives.

Another set of studies suggests that echo chambers exist, but that these not a widespread phenomenon: Based on survey data, Dubois and Blank (2018) show that most people do consume news from various sources, while around 8% consume media with low diversity. Similarly, Rusche (2022) shows that, most Twitter users do not show behavior that resembles that of an echo chamber. However, through high levels of online activity, the small group of users that do, make up a substantial share populist politicians' followers, thus creating homogeneous online spaces.

Finally, there are other studies which contradict the existence of echo chambers. Some found that people also share news reports that don't align with their political beliefs.
Others found that people using social media are being exposed to more diverse sources than people not using social media.
In summation, it remains that clear and distinct findings are  absent which  either confirm  or falsify  the concerns of echo chamber effects.

Research on the social dynamics of echo chambers shows that the fragmented nature of online culture, the importance of collective identity construction, and the argumentative nature of online controversies can generate echo chambers where participants encounter self-reinforcing beliefs. Researchers show that echo chambers are prime vehicles to disseminate disinformation, as participants exploit contradictions against perceived opponents amidst identity-driven controversies.

Difficulties of researching processes

There are several reasons why empirical findings are so fragmented and unclear, making it difficult to achieve consistent and comparable results. There is a lack of conceptual clarity due to different definitions and the novelty of these phenomena. Measurement methods and usages of concepts are inconsistent. The data used in empirical research isn't representative of the entire population because the effects are measured in either an individual or a specific group; Facebook users in the US, for example, are more likely to be feminine and have a higher educational status than the average US population. Social media platforms continually change their algorithmic filtering without making these algorithms public. Finally, most studies are done in the US, which has a two-party system, and their results cannot be applied to political systems with more political parties.

Echo chambers vs epistemic bubbles 
In recent years, closed epistemic networks have increasingly been held responsible for the era of post-truth and fake news. However, the media frequently conflates two distinct concepts of social epistemology: echo chambers and epistemic bubbles.

An epistemic bubble is an informational network in which important sources have been excluded by omission, perhaps unintentionally. It is an impaired epistemic framework which lacks strong connectivity. Members within epistemic bubbles are unaware of significant information and reasoning.

On the other hand, an echo chamber is an epistemic construct in which voices are actively excluded and discredited. It does not suffer from a lack in connectivity; rather it depends on a manipulation of trust by methodically discrediting all outside sources. According to research conducted by the University of Pennsylvania, members of echo chambers become dependent on the sources within the chamber and highly resistant to any external sources.

An important distinction exists in the strength of the respective epistemic structures. Epistemic bubbles are not particularly robust. Relevant information has merely been left out, not discredited. One can ‘pop’ an epistemic bubble by exposing a member to the information and sources that they have been missing.

Echo chambers, however, are incredibly strong. By creating pre-emptive distrust between members and non-members, insiders will be insulated from the validity of counter-evidence and will continue to reinforce the chamber in the form of a closed loop. Outside voices are heard, but dismissed.

As such, the two concepts are fundamentally distinct and cannot be utilized interchangeably. However, one must note that this distinction is conceptual in nature, and an epistemic community can exercise multiple methods of exclusion to varying extents.

Similar concepts 

A filter bubble – a term coined by internet activist Eli Pariser – is a state of intellectual isolation that allegedly can result from personalized searches when a website algorithm selectively guesses what information a user would like to see based on information about the user, such as location, past click-behavior and search history. As a result, users become separated from information that disagrees with their viewpoints, effectively isolating them in their own cultural or ideological bubbles. The choices made by these algorithms are not transparent.

Homophily is the tendency of individuals to associate and bond with similar others, as in the proverb "birds of a feather flock together". The presence of homophily has been detected in a vast array of network studies. For example, a study conducted by Bakshy et. al. explored the data of 10.1 million Facebook users. These users identified as either politically liberal, moderate, or conservative, and the vast majority of their friends were found to have a political orientation that was similar to their own. Facebook algorithms recognize this and selects information with a bias towards this political orientation to showcase in their newsfeed.

Recommender systems are information filtering systems put in place on different platforms that provide recommendations depending on information gathered from the user. In general, recommendations are provided in three different ways: based on content that was previously selected by the user, content that has similar properties or characteristics to that which has been previously selected by the user, or a combination of both.

Both echo chambers and filter bubbles relate to the ways individuals are exposed to content devoid of clashing opinions, and colloquially might be used interchangeably. However, echo chamber refers to the overall phenomenon by which individuals are exposed only to information from like-minded individuals, while filter bubbles are a result of algorithms that choose content based on previous online behavior, as with search histories or online shopping activity. Indeed, specific combinations of homophily and recommender systems have been identified as significant drivers for determining the emergence of echo chambers.

Implications of echo chambers

Online communities 

Online social communities become fragmented by echo chambers when like-minded people group together and members hear arguments in one specific direction with no counter argument addressed. In certain online platforms, such as Twitter, echo chambers are more likely to be found when the topic is more political in nature compared to topics that are seen as more neutral. Social networking communities are communities that are considered to be some of the most powerful reinforcements of rumors due to the trust in the evidence supplied by their own social group and peers, over the information circulating the news. In addition to this, the reduction of fear that users can enjoy through projecting their views on the internet versus face-to-face allows for further engagement in agreement with their peers.

This can create significant barriers to critical discourse within an online medium. Social discussion and sharing can potentially suffer when people have a narrow information base and do not reach outside their network.  Essentially, the filter bubble can distort one's reality in ways which are not believed to be alterable by outside sources.

Findings by Tokita et al. (2021) suggest that individuals’ behavior within echo chambers may dampen their access to information even from desirable sources. In highly polarized information environments, individuals who are highly reactive to socially-shared information are more likely than their less reactive counterparts to curate politically homogenous information environments and experience decreased information diffusion in order to avoid overreacting to news they deem unimportant. This makes these individuals more likely to develop extreme opinions and to overestimate the degree to which they are informed.

Offline communities 

Many offline communities are also segregated by political beliefs and cultural views. The echo chamber effect may prevent individuals from noticing changes in language and culture involving groups other than their own. Online echo chambers can sometimes influence an individual's willingness to participate in similar discussions offline. A 2016 study found that "Twitter users who felt their audience on Twitter agreed with their opinion were more willing to speak out on that issue in the workplace".

Group polarization can occur as a result of growing echo chambers. The lack of external viewpoints and the presence of a majority of individuals sharing a similar opinion or narrative can lead to a more extreme belief set. Group polarisation can also aid the current of fake news and misinformation through social media platforms. This can extend to offline interactions, with data revealing that offline interactions can be as polarising as online interactions (Twitter), arguably due to social media-enabled debates being highly fragmented.

Examples  

Echo chambers have existed in many forms, such as:

 The McMartin preschool trial coverage was criticized by David Shaw in his 1990 Pulitzer Prize winning articles, "None of these charges was ultimately proved, but the media largely acted in a pack, as it so often does on big events, and reporters' stories, in print and on the air, fed on one another, creating an echo chamber of horrors." Shaw stated that this case "exposed basic flaws" in news organizations such as "Laziness. Superficiality. Cozy relationships" and "a frantic search to be first with the latest shocking allegation". His mention of "Reporters and editors often abandoned" journalistic principles of "fairness and skepticism" and "frequently plunged into hysteria, sensationalism and what one editor calls 'a lynch mob syndrome shows the effect of such an echo chamber and how it alters the coverage of specific types of media.
The conservative radio host, Rush Limbaugh, and his radio show was categorized as an echo chamber in the first empirical study concerning echo chambers by researchers Kathleen Hall Jamieson and Frank Capella in their book: Echo Chamber: Rush Limbaugh and the Conservative Media Establishment (2008)
 The Clinton-Lewinsky scandal reporting was chronicled in Time magazine's 16 February 1998 "Trial by Leaks" cover story "The Press And The Dress: The anatomy of a salacious leak, and how it ricocheted around the walls of the media echo chamber" by Adam Cohen. This case was also reviewed in depth by the Project for Excellence in Journalism in "The Clinton/Lewinsky Story: How Accurate? How Fair?"
 A New Statesman essay argued that echo chambers were linked to the UK Brexit referendum.
The subreddit /r/incels and other online incel communities have also been described as echo chambers.
 Discussion concerning opioid drugs and whether or not they should be considered suitable for long-term pain maintenance.
 The 2016 presidential election was described as an echo chamber, as information was exchanged primarily among individuals with similar political and ideological views. Donald Trump and Hillary Clinton were extremely vocal on Twitter throughout the electoral campaigns, bringing many vocal opinion leaders to the platform. A study conducted by Guo et. al. showed that Twitter communities in support of Trump and Clinton differed significantly, and those that were most vocal were responsible for creating echochambers within these communities.
 The network of Youtube Channels harbouring and circulating the Flat-Earth Theory has been described as an echo chamber 

However, since the creation of the internet, scholars have been curious to see the changes in political communication. Due to the new changes in information technology and how it is managed, it is unclear how opposing perspectives can reach common ground in a democracy. The effects seen from the echo chamber effect has largely been cited to occur in politics, such as Twitter and Facebook during the 2016 presidential election in the United States. Some believe that echo chambers played a big part in the success of Donald Trump in the 2016 presidential elections.

Countermeasures

From media companies 
Some companies have also made efforts in combating the effects of an echo chamber on an algorithmic approach. A high-profile example of this is the changes Facebook made to its "Trending" page, which is an on-site news source for its users. Facebook modified their "Trending" page by transitioning from displaying a single news source to multiple news sources for a topic or event. The intended purpose of this was to expand the breadth of news sources for any given headline, and therefore expose readers to a variety of viewpoints. There are startups building apps with the mission of encouraging users to open their echo chambers, such as unFound.news. Another example is a beta feature on BuzzFeed News, called "Outside Your Bubble". This experiment adds a module at the bottom of BuzzFeed News articles to show reactions from various platforms, like Twitter, Facebook, and Reddit. This concept aims to bring transparency and prevent biased conversations, diversifying the viewpoints their readers are exposed to.

Solution 
A 2022 study focused on how one can resolve online echo chambers without surveillance of individuals. In social networks, users often engage with like-minded peers. This selective exposure to opinions might result in echo chambers, i.e., political fragmentation and social polarization of user interactions. When echo chambers form, opinions have a bimodal distribution with two peaks on opposite sides. In certain issues, where either extreme positions contain a degree of misinformation, neutral consensus is preferable for promoting discourse. In a 2022 study the researchers introduce the random dynamical nudge (RDN), which presents each agent with input from a random selection of other agents’ opinions and does not require surveillance of every person’s opinions. the computational results in two different models suggest that the random dynamical nudge leads to a unimodal distribution of opinions centered around the neutral consensus. Furthermore, the random dynamical nudge is effective both for preventing the formation of echo chambers and also for depolarizing existing echo chambers. Due to the simple and robust nature of the random dynamical nudge, social media networks might be able to implement a version of this self-feedback mechanism, when appropriate, to prevent the segregation of online communities on complex social issues.

See also 

 Algorithmic curation
 Algorithmic radicalization
 Availability cascade
 Circular source
 Communal reinforcement
 False consensus effect
 Filter bubble
 Groupthink
 Opinion corridor
 Positive feedback
 Safe-space
 Selective exposure theory
 Splinternet
 Tribe (Internet)
 Woozle effect

References 

Influence of mass media
Mass media issues
Media bias
Public opinion
Propaganda techniques
Social influence